Ilse Keydel (11 February 1921 in Hannover, Germany – 5 May 2003 in Hannover) was a German fencer who won three medals in the foil events at world championships. Her bronze medal in 1953 was the first West Germany medal in fencing at world championships.

References

1921 births
2003 deaths
German female fencers
Sportspeople from Hanover